The 1974–75 Marquette Warriors men's basketball team represented Marquette University in NCAA Division I men's competition in the 1974–75 academic year. They received the conference's automatic bid to the NCAA Tournament where they lost in the first round to Kentucky.

Schedule

Rankings

External links
MUScoop's MUWiki

References 

Marquette
Marquette Golden Eagles men's basketball seasons
Marquette
Marq
Marq